Cooks Falls is a hamlet in Delaware County, New York, United States. It is located east-southeast of East Branch on the north shore of Beaver Kill.

References

 Geography of Delaware County, New York
 Hamlets in Delaware County, New York
 Hamlets in New York (state)